Ap' ta kokala vgalmena is a 2011 Greek comedy film directed by Sotiris Goritsas.

Plot 
George Spyratos (Argyris Xafis) is an idealistic doctor who gets frustrated with the reality of Greek hospitals.

Cast 
 Argyris Xafis - George Spyratos
  - Pampos Kolokasis
  - Dora
 Minas Hatzisavvas - Konstantinos Theotokis

References

External links 

2011 comedy films
2011 films
Greek comedy films